Lake Ellen is a lake located near Cascade, Wisconsin, approximately  northwest of Milwaukee, and is a  lake with a maximum depth of . Used for recreational boating, fishing and swimming, it is surrounded by cabins and small cottages. The lake is also home to largemouth bass, northern pike and panfish, including bluegills, crappies, yellow perch, pumpkinseed sunfish, rock bass and white bass. The Department of Natural Resources stocks about 12,000 walleye fingerlings every other year.

External links

Lakes of Sheboygan County, Wisconsin
Tourist attractions in Sheboygan County, Wisconsin